Turkey's involvement in the Syrian civil war began diplomatically and later escalated militarily. Initially, Turkey condemned the Syrian government at the outbreak of civil unrest in Syria during the spring of 2011; the Turkish government's involvement gradually evolved into military assistance for the Free Syrian Army in July 2011, border clashes in 2012, and direct military interventions in 2016–17, in 2018, in 2019, 2020, and in 2022. The military operations have resulted in the Turkish occupation of northern Syria since August 2016.

After a decade of relatively friendly relations with Syria from 2000 to 2010, Turkey condemned Syrian president Bashar al-Assad over the violent crackdown on protests in 2011 and later that year joined a number of other countries demanding his resignation. From the beginning of the war, Turkey trained defectors of the Syrian Army in its territory under the supervision of the Turkish National Intelligence Organisation (MİT), among whom emerged the Free Syrian Army (FSA) in July 2011. In May 2012, the Turkish National Intelligence Organisation (MİT) began arming and training the FSA and provided them with a base of operations. Tensions between Syria and Turkey significantly worsened after Syrian forces shot down a Turkish fighter jet in June 2012, and border clashes erupted in October 2012. On 24 August 2016, the Turkish Armed Forces began a direct military intervention into Syria by declaring Operation Euphrates Shield, mainly targeting the Islamic State of Iraq and the Levant.

Turkey has strongly supported Syrian dissidents. Syrian opposition activists convened in Istanbul in May 2011 to discuss regime change, and Turkey hosted the head of the Free Syrian Army, Colonel Riad al-Asaad. Turkey became increasingly hostile to the Assad government's policies and encouraged reconciliation among dissident factions. Turkish President Recep Tayyip Erdoğan declared his intent to "cultivate a favorable relationship with whatever government would take the place of Assad." In 2017, it facilitated the establishment of the Syrian National Army of the Syrian Interim Government, which it finances.

A study by Metropoll in September 2019 found that 68% of Turks disapprove of the current government policies on Syria. The poll also found that 47.5% of Turks see the Free Syrian Army as an "enemy". Three out of four Turks said that Syrian refugees should return to Syria "even if the war continues". According to another research by Metropoll, the amount of support for 2019 Turkish offensive into north-eastern Syria was at 79%, while Operation Olive Branch had 71% support.

Background 

Since 1999, when Bashar al-Assad's father Hafez al-Assad expelled Kurdish leader Abdullah Öcalan, relations between Syria and Turkey warmed. The Turkish Parliament's refusal to cooperate militarily with the 2003 invasion of Iraq was a turning point in Syrian-Turkish bilateral relations as Syria's perceptions of Turkey as incapable of acting independently were altered. The normalization of relations started in late 2004, when the Turkish Prime Minister Recep Tayyip Erdoğan flew to Damascus to sign a free trade agreement.

Turkey and anti-government forces in Syria 

At the beginning of the Syrian Civil War, Turkey trained defectors of the Syrian Army on its territory, and in July 2011, a group of them announced the birth of the Free Syrian Army, under the supervision of Turkish intelligence. In October 2011, Turkey began sheltering the Free Syrian Army, offering the group a safe zone and a base of operations. Together with Saudi Arabia and Qatar, Turkey has also provided the rebels with arms and other military equipment.

On 22 June 2012, a Turkish McDonnell Douglas RF-4E Phantom II reconnaissance jet was intercepted and shot down by the Syrian Army in international airspace and greatly escalated the tensions between the two countries.

In October 2012, numerous clashes took place along the Syrian–Turkish border, resulting in the deaths of 14 Syrian soldiers and 5 Turkish civilians. The clashes strained the relations between the countries and resulting in dozens of civilians and military personnel killed. Syria has repeatedly urged UN Security Council action to "put an end to the crimes of the Turkish regime".

On 5 August 2012, Recep Tayyip Erdoğan criticised the Republican People's Party (CHP) leader Kemal Kılıçdaroğlu for siding with the Syrian regime over the Syrian people, when he said:

Turkish support to anti-Government forces in Syria

Al-Nusra Front and the Army of Conquest 
Turkey, Qatar, and Saudi Arabia have supported the Army of Conquest. The coalition includes the al-Nusra Front (the Syrian affiliate of al-Qaeda) and Ahrar al-Sham, but it also included non-al-Qaeda-linked Islamist factions, such as the Sham Legion, that have received covert arms support from the United States. According to The Independent, some Turkish officials said they were giving logistical and intelligence support to the command center of the coalition, but said they did not give direct help to al-Nusra, while acknowledging that the group would be beneficiaries. It was also reported that some rebels and officials say that material support in the form of money and weapons to the Islamist groups was being given by Saudis with Turkey facilitating its passage. Al-Ahram reported that President Obama of the United States chose not to confront Saudi Arabia and Qatar over the issue at a May 2015 meeting of the Gulf Cooperation Council, although al-Nusra and Ahrar al-Sham troops made up 90% of the troops in the Idlib region, where they were making substantial gains against the Assad government.

Turkey had reportedly criticised designation of the Nusra Front as a terrorist organisation. Feridun Sinirlioğlu had reportedly told his American interlocutors that it was more important to focus on the "chaos" that Assad has created instead of groups such as al-Nusra. Al-Monitor claimed in 2013 that Turkey was reconsidering its support for Nusra. Turkey's designation of the Nusra Front as a terrorist group since June 2014 was seen as an indication of it giving up on the group. Turkish opposition parties have accused Erdogan and his government have supported terrorism in Syria. In June 2014, İhsan Özkes, a parliamentarian from CHP, stated that a directive had been signed by Turkish Interior Minister Muammer Güler, ordering the provision of support to Al-Nusra against PYD. Güler said this statement false and said that a directive with the letterhead of the Governor's Office of Hatay could not be possibly signed by a minister, which is a direct proof of the document's inauthenticity. Former United States Ambassador to Turkey, Francis Ricciardone stated that Turkey had directly supported and worked with Ahrar al-Sham and al-Qaeda's wing in Syria for a period of time thinking that they could work with extremist Islamist groups and push them to become more moderate at the same time, an attempt which failed. He said that he tried to persuade the Turkish government to close its borders to the groups, but to no avail. Seymour Hersh in an article published on London Review of Books on 17 April 2014  said that senior US military leaders and the intelligence community were concerned about Turkey's role and stated that Erdogan was a supporter of al-Nusra Front and other Islamist rebel groups.

On 9 January 2017, Turkey summoned the Russian and Iranian ambassadors to express its disturbance over airstrikes of the Syrian Army in the Idlib Governorate.
On 5 May 2017, Mehmet Görmez, the Turkish president of religious affairs, met with Harith al-Dhari, an Iraqi Sunni cleric who was designated by the Al-Qaida Sanctions Committee as an "individual associated with al-Qaeda" in 2010. Al-Dhari was reported to have "provided operational guidance, financial support, and other services to or in support of al-Qaeda in Iraq."

Turkistan Islamic Party 
Arab media stated that the village of Az-Zanbaqi in Jisr al-Shughur's countryside has become a base for a massive amount of Uyghur Turkistan Islamic Party militants and their families in Syria, estimated at around 3,500. They further stated the Turkish intelligence was being involved in transporting these Uyghurs via Turkey to Syria, with the aim of using them first in Syria to help Jabhat Al-Nusra and gain combat experience fighting against the Syrian Army before sending them back to Xinjiang to fight against China if they manage to survive. Arab news agencies reported that the Uyghurs in the Turkistan Islamic Party, the Chechens in Junud al-Sham, Jabhat al-Nusra and Ahrar al-Sham are being coordinated by Turkish intelligence to work with the Army of Conquest. Turkish media agencies, on the other hand, denied this and stated that it was a scheme of the Chinese government to promise a holy cause and new lands to Uyghur forces with Islamic tendencies, which would eventually be cited by the government as the reason for more oppressive policies towards the Uyghur people. The validity of the Chinese statements had also been challenged by Sean Roberts of Georgetown University in an article on global terrorism. Conversely, other reports emphasized on the Uyghur fighters' ties with ISIL, which led to the 2017 Istanbul nightclub shooting against Turkey.

Islamic State of Iraq and the Levant (ISIL)

Allegations of Turkish cooperation with and support for ISIL 
Ever since the formal founding of ISIL from its Islamist predecessor groups in June 2014, Turkey has faced numerous allegations of collaboration with and support for ISIL in international media. Several of the allegations have focused on Turkish businessman and politician Berat Albayrak, who has faced calls for his prosecution in the United States.

Turkey has, despite national and international criticism, largely refused to directly engage militants of the Islamic State of Iraq and the Levant (ISIL), despite continued threats from ISIL to pursue more operations on Turkish soil. The Turkish response to the ISIL-led Siege of Kobanî as well as a series of terrorist attacks on Turkish soil reportedly linked to ISIL perpetrators, was largely subdued apart from a series of incidents on the Turkish–Syrian border. On 23 July 2014 one Turkish sergeant was killed by fire from ISIL forces in Syria, and four Turkish tanks returned fire into ISIL held territory in Syria. The following day ISIL and Turkish soldiers actively engaged in the Turkish border town of Kilis, marking a dangerous new escalation in the ties between Turkey and ISIL. Turkish F-16 Fighting Falcons struck ISIL targets across the border from Kilis Province with smart bombs, the Turkish government announced.

The Turkish government stated that this was to prevent an attempted invasion by ISIL troops.

On 25 August 2015, the Turkish newspaper Bugün ran a front-page story, illustrated with video stills, about what it said was the transfer, under the observation of Turkish border guards, of weapon and explosives from Turkey to ISIL through the Akcakale border post. Bugün reported that such transfers were occurring on a daily basis and had been going on for two months. In response, a couple of days later offices of Koza İpek Media Group, the owner of the newspaper, were raided by Turkish police. In October 2015 control of Koza İpek Media Group was seized by the Ankara Chief Public Prosecutor's Office which then appointed new managers with links to the ruling Justice and Development Party (AKP), and in July 2016 Bugün was closed down on the orders of President Recep Tayyip Erdoğan.

In late November 2015, Turkey started tougher controls to stop ISIL militants crossing on a 60-mile stretch of the border with Syria where ISIL had control of the Syrian side. The crossing was used for smuggling and for arms transfers. This followed Russian President Putin directly said Turkey was aiding ISIL and al-Qaeda, and pressure from the U.S.

In April 2018, an article was published by Foreign Policy in which it was stated that in 2013 alone, some 30,000 militants traversed Turkish soil, establishing the so-called jihadi highway, as the country became a conduit for fighters seeking to join the Islamic State. Furthermore, it was stated that wounded Islamic State militants were treated for free at hospitals across southeastern Turkey. Among those receiving the care was one of the top deputies of Islamic State chieftain Abu Bakr al-Baghdadi, Ahmet el-H, who was treated in a private hospital in Sanliurfa in August 2014.

2017 Idlib operation 

On 7 October 2017, Turkish forces launched an operation to establish observation posts in the northern Idlib Governorate, in coordination with Russia.

2020 clashes with the Syrian Arab Army in Idlib 

On 3 February 2020, Syrian and Turkish forces exchanged fire in Idlib, Latakia and the northern Aleppo countryside during the 5th northwestern Syria offensive. Turkey and the SOHR reported seven Turkish soldiers, one civilian contractor, and 13 Syrian soldiers were killed. Turkey's president Erdoğan demanded that Russian forces in Idlib "stand aside"; he nevertheless dismissed the possibility of direct conflict with Russia saying Turkey and Russia would talk about the issue “without anger”. On 10 February, Syrian government forces shelled a recently built Turkish observation post at Taftanaz Military Airbase, killing five Turkish soldiers, according to the Turkish Defense Ministry. According to the SOHR, six Turkish soldiers and four Syrian rebels were killed in the attack. On 11 February, Turkish Armed Forces shot down a Syrian Government helicopter, Mil Mi-17, near Nayrab killing all its crew. On 27 February 33 Turkish soldiers were killed in an air-raid carried out by the Syrian Air Force. Therefore, Turkey and proxy forces started to target the regime forces and their allies until they recaptured Saraqib, and cut the Damascus-Aleppo M5 highway once again.

As the deadline to withdraw to the initial de-escalation lines behind the Turkish observation points, previously set by Turkish President Erdoğan to halt the Syrian regime assault in Idlib Governorate, ended by the end of February. On 1 March, Turkey initiated a military operation code-named as Operation Spring Shield, against the Syrian regime, which aims to protect local Syrians and to install a lasting ceasefire, according to the Turkish Defense Minister Hulusi Akar.

From 27 Feb to 5 March, Turkey claimed the Turkish military have neutralized 3,138 Syrian Army soldiers and militia, and destroyed the following material: 3 fighter jets, 8 helicopters, 3 UAVs, 151 tanks, 47 howitzers, 52 launchers, 12 antitank weapons, 4 mortars, 10 arsenal depots and 145 military, technical and combat vehicles. Turkish Armed Forces have also released a 12-minutes of drone footage that wrought havoc. According to the SOHR, Turkish troops killed 165 Syrian soldiers and fighters loyal to the regime.

On 5 March 2020, Turkey alongside Russia announced that a ceasefire in Syria's north-west region of Idlib would come into force from the very midnight. The decision was taken in light of the rising number of human rights violations, since the offensive began in region. However, Turkey informed that it still reserved "the right to retaliate with all its strength against any attack" carried out by the forces of Syrian government.

Turkish–Kurdish conflict 

The Turkish government promotes a narrative according to which the Democratic Union Party (PYD), the leading political party of the Autonomous Administration of North and East Syria (AANES), and the People's Protection Units (YPG) militia, the leading component group of the Syrian Democratic Forces (SDF), were reportedly "seizing and ethnically cleansing territories which don't belong to Kurds." No evidence has been provided for these assertions, which were refuted by the United Nations. Turkish president Erdogan has stated that "What is important is to prepare a controlled life in this enormous area, and the most suitable people for it are Arabs. These areas are not suitable for the lifestyle of Kurds ... because these areas are virtually desert", although Syrian Kurdistan is mostly north of the Syrian Desert.

Turkey has received the co-chair of Syrian Kurdish Democratic Union Party (PYD), Salih Muslim, for talks in 2013 and in 2014, even entertaining the idea of opening a Rojava representation office in Ankara "if it's suitable with Ankara's policies." Nonwithstanding, Turkey is persistently hostile, because it feels threatened by Rojava's emergence encouraging activism for autonomy among Kurds in Turkey and the Kurdish–Turkish conflict, and in this context in particular Rojava's leading Democratic Union Party (PYD) and the People's Protection Units (YPG) militia being members of the Kurdistan Communities Union (KCK) network of organisations, which also includes both political and militant Kurdish organizations in Turkey itself, including the Kurdistan Workers' Party (PKK). Turkey's policy towards Rojava is based on an economic blockade, persistent attempts of international isolation, opposition to the cooperation of the international Anti-ISIL-coalition with Rojava militias, and support of Islamist Syrian Civil War parties hostile towards Rojava, in past times even including ISIL. Turkey has on several occasions also been militarily attacking Rojava territory and defence forces. The latter has resulted in some of the most clearcut instances of international solidarity with Rojava.

In the perception of much of the Turkish public, the Rojava federal project as well as U.S. support against ISIL are elements of a wider conspiracy scheme by a "mastermind" with the aim to weaken or even dismember Turkey, in order to prevent its imminent rise as a global power. Opposition leader Selahattin Demirtas has said asked for Turkey and other countries to recognize Rojava and work with it as a partner.

2014 intervention plans 

On 27 March 2014 an audio tape recording of high-level Turkish officials discussing Turkey's Syria strategy was released on YouTube. The officials discussed a false flag operation that would lead to an invasion of Syria. YouTube was subsequently blocked in Turkey.

A vote in the Turkish Parliament was scheduled for 1 October 2014 on whether or not to invade Syria as part of the war on ISIL. while preparations for a possible intervention were made. It was later delayed a day.

The de facto "declaration of war" took the form of two separate motions, one on Iraq and one on Syria, which would authorize Turkish troops to invade those countries. the opposition said they hadn't been able to read either motion, as the exact text had been delayed.

Deputy Prime Minister Bülent Arınç said that the gist of the resolutions was to extend the current mandate for "hot pursuit" against the PKK and Syrian Army into Syria and Iraq, which was to end the second week in October, to add the Islamic State to the list, and to set up a buffer zone on the Syrian side of the border.

President Recep Tayyip Erdoğan opened the parliamentary session by saying that Turkey would fight against the Islamic State and other "terrorist" groups in the region, but would stick to its aim of seeing Bashar al-Assad removed from power.

After two days of heated debate, the motion passed 298–98.

2014–2015: Kobanî activity 

With the Turkish government thinking that a declaration was enough, and with only a minimum of western airstrikes helping the defenders of Kobanî, ISIL troops edged closer to the city, eventually entering it from the south and east. Feeling betrayed by the Turkish government and hearing that Prime Minister Ahmet Davutoğlu's previous vow not to let Kobanî fall was, in fact, a lie, refugees on the border and citizens in the cities of Istanbul, Ankara, Antakya, Antalya, Eskişehir, Denizli, Kocaeli, Diyarbakır, Siirt, Batman, and elsewhere began to protest. Turkish police responded with tear gas and water cannons, and live fire in the southern province of Adana, killing protestors.

By 7 October, ISIL militants and Kurdish defenders were fighting in the streets of Kobanî, with many dead and scores wounded on both sides. As the battle for Kobanî continued to rage, rioting continued in Turkey, and almost 40 people were killed in street clashes by mid-October. In late October, ISIL began shelling the border post near Kobanî. On 11 October, Turkish President Erdogan denounced the protests, stating that they were attacking Turkey's "peace, stability, and environment of trust." He stated that the government was already caring for 200,000 Kurdish refugees from the Kobanî area and asked, "What does Kobanî have to do with Turkey?" By mid-October, fighting had also renewed between Turkish military forces and Kurdistan Workers' Party (PKK) elements in southeastern Turkey.

On 29 November 2014, ISIL fighters began attacking YPG fighters in Kobanî from Turkish territory. Kurdish sources in Kobane said that on 29 November ISIL fighters attacked Kobane from Turkish territory, and that the assault began with a vehicle driven by a suicide bomber coming from Turkish territory. During the attack, a group of ISIL fighters were seen atop granary silos on the Turkish side of the border. According to the German news outlet 'Der Spiegel', ISIL fighters also attacked YPG positions near the border gate from Turkish soil. According to the Syrian Observatory for Human Rights (SOHR), YPG fighters crossed the Turkish border and attacked ISIL positions on Turkish soil, before pulling back to Syria. Soon afterward, the Turkish Army regained control of the border crossing and silos area.

On 25 June 2015, fighters from ISIL launched an attack against Kobanî, detonating three car bombs. The ISIL fighters were reported to have disguised themselves as Kurdish security forces, before entering the town and shooting civilians with assault rifles and RPGs. Over 164 people were killed and 200 injured. Kurdish forces and the Syrian government stated the vehicles had entered the city from across the border, an action denied by Turkey. ISIS also committed a massacre in the village of Barkh Butan, about 20 kilometres south of Kobanî, executing at least 23 Syrian Kurds, among them women and children.

2015 intervention plans 
With the governing party losing its majority in the Turkish general election on 7 June 2015, rumors began to circulate that President Erdoğan would order an intervention of Syria to prevent the creation of a Kurdish state straddling northern Syria and Iraq.

On 26 June, Erdogan said he would "never allow the establishment of a Kurdish state in northern Syria". By the end of June, a number of Turkish newspapers reported that Ankara was considering a ground operation to establish a buffer zone in Northern Syria to prevent Syrian Kurds from declaring an independent state, a zone 110 km long and 33 km deep along the Turkish border.

The military demanded legal backing for such a move, and on 29 June 2015, Erdoğan chaired a meeting of the National Security Council to provide just that.

Leaked plans stated that, sometime during the first couple of weeks of July, up to 18,000 troops would invade Syria via the Jarablus and Aazaz border crossings, areas in the hands of ISIL and the Free Syrian Army, respectively, and set up a buffer zone to which refugees could be repatriated.

Limiting intervention to airstrikes has also been discussed. The idea of going into Syria proved extremely unpopular with most sections of Turkish society, dissuading the government from invading.v

2015–2016: Rojava expands and increased Turkish hostility 

On 24 and 25 October 2015, Kurds said the Turkish military opened fire at its forces in Tal Abyad after the majority Arab town was included into Kobanî Canton. The Turkish Prime Minister Ahmet Davutoglu confirmed it, saying "we hit it twice,". There were no casualties in the shooting and the Kurdish forces didn't return fire. On 25 October, Turkish forces also attacked the village of Buban. During the attack two civilians wounded.

In December 2015, the Syrian Democratic Forces (SDF), the newly founded umbrella for Rojava-affiliated militias, captured the Tishrin Dam and crossed the Euphrates, capturing the town of Tishrin and other nearby areas from ISIL, paving the way for a future offensive toward Manbij.

On 15 February 2016, Turkey hit again Kurdish forces in Syria. A Turkish Foreign Ministry spokesman said the strikes came after a border security outpost in the Hatay area was attacked. In addition, the Syrian Observatory for Human Rights said that Turkish troops were shelling the road to the west of the town of Tal Rifaat and also the region to the west of the Syrian border town of Azaz, but failed to stop the advance of the Kurdish forces. On 16 February 2016, Turkish forces continued to shell the positions of Syrian Kurds in northern Syria for the fourth day. Turkish military said that it was retaliating to fire coming from the region. On 17 February 2016, in Ankara, a car bombing attack happened at night. The attack targeted a convoy of military vehicles. Turkish Prime Minister Ahmet Davutoglu and President Erdogan blamed a Syrian Kurdish militia fighter working with Kurdish militants inside Turkey for a suicide car bombing, and vowed retaliation in both Syria and Iraq. However the Kurdistan Freedom Falcons (TAK) took responsibility for the attack and said they targeted security forces.

On 22 February 2016, U.S.–Russia joint cease-fire deal announced to take effect in Syria on 27 Feb, but the "cessation of hostilities" does not include ISIL and the al-Nusra Front, the main jihadist factions. On 24 Feb, Turkish president, Erdoğan, during a speech said that "The PYD and the YPG need to be out of the scope of the cease-fire, just like Daesh (ISIL) is,". Turkish president Recep Tayyip Erdogan said that Turkey would continue shelling Kurdish militants across the border in Syria, despite calls from Washington and other Western capitals to halt the attacks. On 19 February Turkish artillery units shelled again PYD targets in northern Syria. Opposition groups reported that over the previous few days they had brought over 2,000 reinforcements with heavy equipment from the Idlib area, through Turkey assisted by Turkish forces, to fight against Kurdish militias north of Aleppo and to support rebels in Azaz. Pentagon Press Secretary Peter Cook said that Turkey's shelling of YPG forces in northern Syria would be an "ongoing topic of conversation" between USA and Turkey.

On 4 March 2016, the YPG militia said that Turkey's tanks had fired dozens of shells at its positions in the area of Afrin in northwest Syria. Russia's Defense Ministry reported that Turkey continued to shell Kurdish forces in Syria, hampering their operations against Al-Nusra, and at the same time funneling supplies to the militant-controlled areas at the border. The Ministry also stated that jihadists and Turkish trucks supplying them continued to freely cross the Turkish-Syrian border. On 6 March, jihadists shelled Turkish areas from Syrian territory in an attempt to provoke a response that could lead to Ankara sending troops into the neighboring country. On 8 March, Mortar shells fired from Syria in Turkey and killed 2 civilians, the Turkish military returned fire into Syria. According to Prime Minister Ahmet Davutoglu, Islamic State militants were responsible for the attack.

In the wake of the major military advances that Syrian government forces and Syrian Democratic Forces made against jihadists during the Northern Aleppo offensive (February 2016), Ankara called for a safe zone and "no-fly zone", "free from clashes", in northern Aleppo governorate. The proposal did not garner any real support from Washington or NATO allies who fear it would require an internationally patrolled no-fly zone and potentially put them in direct confrontation with Assad and his allies. Only, German Chancellor Angela Merkel said, that such a "safe zone" would be "helpful in the current situation." Russia with dominance over Syria's skies, came out against the idea and, also, Russian Foreign Minister Sergey Lavrov said: "This is not Merkel's initiative, this is a Turkish initiative." In addition, Russian Deputy Foreign Minister Gennady Gatilov said that any decision to create a no-fly zone over Syria cannot be made without the approval of the government in Damascus as well as the UN Security Council.

In February 2016, Turkey and Saudi Arabia were pressing for ground operations in Syria, hoping for the involvement of the U.S. and the other allies. Hezbollah said Turkey and Saudi Arabia were using the Islamic State group as a "pretext" to launch a ground operation in Syria.

In April 2016, factions of the SDF formed the Manbij Military Council. The U.S. asked for Turkey's support for the Manbij offensive, but Turkey had two demands that were rejected, namely that the forces in the offensive should leave the secular SDF umbrella, and that the U.S. should increase its airstrikes for jihadist groups Turkey supports. When the offensive started, the Washington Post reported it under the headline of "Ignoring Turkey, U.S. backs Kurds in drive against ISIS in Syria".

On 22 August 2016, Turkey fired artillery at ISIS in Jarablus, and it also shelled YPG fighters north of Manbij. A spokesperson for the Kurdish-Arab Syrian Democratic Forces (SDF) said: "The Turkish state officially supports Daesh (ISIS) and bombs the positions of the Manbij Military Council and its countryside in the northern axis of the defense positions at Sajur River," The SDF is dominated by the Kurdish Democratic Union Party (PYD).

2016–2017 military intervention 

On 24 August 2016, the Turkish armed forces, supported by the U.S., began a declared direct military intervention into Syria. After 2 days of artillery bombardment and airstrikes, the Turkish Land Forces launched an attack on the ISIL-held town of Jarabulus, followed by hundreds of FSA fighters. They were backed by planes from the U.S.-led coalition, launched their first co-ordinated offensive into Syria. Turkey's president Recep Tayyip Erdoğan said on the first day of the operation, called Euphrates Shield, that it was aimed against both the ISIL and People's Protection Units (YPG), a major component of the SDF, saying both ″terror groups that threaten our country in northern Syria″. The immediate goal of the military intervention was the capture of the Syrian town of Jarabulus from the ISIL, which was accomplished on the first day of the operation. It was the first time Turkish warplanes have struck in Syria since November 2015, when Turkey downed the Russian warplane, and the first significant incursion by Turkish special forces since a brief operation to relocate the tomb of Suleyman Shah, in February 2015.

Turkey said the operation was an act of self-defence, in response to Isis shelling of Turkish border towns and suicide bombings and attacks targeting Turkish nationals. Also, the Turkish foreign minister, Mevlüt Çavuşoğlu, said that YPG (Kurds) should return east of Syria's Euphrates River. Both Manbij and Jarablus are west of the river. Syrian Kurdish forces said that the Turkish operation is motivated more by the desire to stop their advance at Jarablus than by anti-ISIS sentiment.

Turkey shelled Syrian Kurdish forces in the region during all the week before the attack, determined not to let them fill the vacuum if ISIS leaves.
The SDF managed to take the town of Amarinah from the FSA after a brief firefight. U.S. Special Operations Forces embedded with SDF forces, to successfully deter Turkey and Turkish-backed jihadi rebels from attacking SDF forces south of the Sajur river in Manbij. Furthermore, the United States Department of Defense confirmed that U.S. Special Operation Forces were flying U.S. flags in the town of Tell Abyad in Kobanî Canton to deter Turkish harassment shelling or attacks against SDF forces there.

On 20 September 2016, the United States Department of Defense confirmed that U.S. Special Operation Forces were flying U.S. flags in the town of Tell Abyad in Kobanî Canton to deter Turkish harassment shelling or attacks. On 21 September, The New York Times reported that the U.S. administration "is weighing a military plan to directly arm Syrian Kurdish fighters combating the Islamic State, a major policy shift that could speed up the offensive against the terrorist group but also sharply escalate tensions between Turkey and the United States." Reacting to these reports, Erdoğan said on 23 September that "arming another terrorist group for fighting another terrorist group is not acceptable." Following these statements, the Turkish army shelled two YPG positions in the Tell Abyad area. On 25 September 2016, the U.S. spokesman for the Combined Joint Task Force – Operation Inherent Resolve (CJTF–OIR) confirmed that the SDF, including the YPG, were also part of the "vetted forces" in the train-and-equip program and would be supplied with weapons. Erdoğan condemned this and said that the SDF were "endangering our future".

On 26 September, Turkey's Deputy Prime Minister Numan Kurtulmuş welcomed  the withdrawal of some YPG units east of the Euphrates river. On 27 September, Turkey sent military units to the border area of Akçakale. The same day, the Turkish foreign minister Mevlüt Çavuşoğlu said that YPG units had not withdrawn from Manbij and its countryside and stated "this means USA either is not capable of influencing YPG or they do not want to influence them." On 3 October, the Turkish government on once again stated that fighters of YPG were still present west of the Euphrates and called on the U.S. to hold to its promise that they withdraw to the east of the river. The following day, Yıldırım said that Turkey could use force to expel YPG from Manbij. As a consequence of the continuing Turkish threats, on 4 October the SDF spokesman explicitly ruled out any Turkish participation in the upcoming joint military operation of the SDF and the CJTF–OIR to capture Raqqa from ISIL. Later an Obama administration official said that at this point the administration's "Plan B", to "retake Raqqa by arming the Kurds", was adopted after the initial plan of using Turkish forces in the Raqqa offensive became unattainable.

On 18 October, Erdoğan said that the YPG would be removed from Manbij after ISIL was driven from al-Bab. In a 21 October report from Jarabulus, the Financial Times assessed Turkish aims towards the SDF and as a conclusion quoted that "Mr Erdoğan is very good at perceptions. It is not important what reality is: people [in Turkey] love hearing Mr Erdoğan's ambitions on the eight o'clock news when they come home." On 25 October, Mevlüt Çavuşoğlu stated that Turkey would dislodge "PYD/PKK" from Manbij if it did not leave the city. On 26 October, Erdoğan said: "We are determined to clear the PYD from Manbij." On 27 October, Erdoğan said he told U.S. President Barack Obama that Free Syrian Army-labeled rebels would advance on ISIL-held al-Bab, then march on to SDF-held Manbij, and then toward the Islamic State capital of Raqqa. On 11 November, Erdoğan stated the goal and roadmap of the Turkish intervention as "expanding the controlled area to cover  including Bab, Manbij and Tell Rifaat, creating a national structure and army for this expanded area to provide solid control and to allow the refugees return to these areas jointly with EU, and after these, focusing on IS's de facto capital Raqqa and PYD." On 22 November, Erdoğan said with respect to Manbij that "we want the place to be totally emptied of the PYD and YPG."

On 29 November, Recep Tayyip Erdoğan, the President of the Republic of Turkey, said that the Turkish military launched its operations in Syria to end the rule of Syrian President Bashar al-Assad. Days later Erdogan sought to retract his statement; media observers attributed his outburst to frustration due to failure of his government's Syria policies. Days later, Erdoğan sought to retract his statement; media observers attributed his comment to frustration "due to failure of his government's Syria policies". In an interview with the state-run Syrian Arab News Agency on 8 December, Syria President Bashar Assad challenged Erdoğan's mental sanity. On 20 January 2017, the Deputy Prime Minister of Turkey, Mehmet Şimşek, said that "we can't say that Assad must go anymore. A deal without Assad isn't realistic."

Acting U.S. Assistant Secretary of Defense for International Security Affairs, Elissa Slotkin, said on 16 January 2017 that the only target for the US-led coalition is ISIL, and not the city of Manbij that had been cleared from ISIL by the SDF. "We are all about hitting ISIS where there is ISIS. If there's no ISIS, that's not our mandate. So that is an important distinction. We have always made it in any kind of conversation we've been having with any ally on Syria." On 27 January 2017, after the multilateral peace talks in Astana, Erdoğan said that "we should not go deeper than Al-Bab" and Mevlüt Çavuşoğlu said "there are different opinions about YPG and Hezbollah. So an agreement can not be reached about the struggle against them". On 31 January, the Germany Defence Ministry ruled out giving Turkey unfiltered access to high-resolution aerial imagery gathered by Tornado fighter jets operating out of Incirlik Air Base in southern Turkey as part of the anti-ISIL coalition, out of concern that Turkey might use it for military action against the SDF.

On 24 April 2017, the Turkish Air Force conducted several airstrikes on YPG and YPJ positions near al-Malikiyah, killing at least 20 fighters.

Potential intervention into Iraq 
On 1 November 2016, the day Iraqi forces entered Mosul in the Battle of Mosul (2016–17) against ISIL, Turkey announced it was sending tanks and artillery from Ankara to Silopi near the Iraqi border. Turkey's Minister of Defense Fikri Işık said the deployment was a move to "prepare for "important developments" in the region and stated that "further action can be taken if Turkey's red lines are crossed". Iraqi Prime Minister Al-Abadi warned Turkey not to invade Iraq, predicting war if they did. Al-Abadi, addressing journalists in Baghdad, said, "We warn Turkey if they want to enter Iraq, they will end up becoming fragmented. ... We do not want to fight Turkey. We do not want a confrontation with Turkey. God forbid, even if we engage in war with them, the Turks will pay a heavy price. They will be damaged. Yes, we too will be damaged, but whenever a country fights a neighboring country, there will be no winner, both will end up losing."

On 5 April 2017, President Recep Tayyip Erdoğan suggested that future stages of the – recently proclaimed concluded – Euphrates Shield Operation would be broader, suggesting that Turkey would also seek to occupy territory of Iraq. Erdogan said that "a future operation will have not [only] a Syrian dimension, [but] also an Iraqi dimension. There are the Tal Afar and Sinjar situations [in Iraq] We also have kin in Mosul."

2018 military intervention 

On 9 January 2018, while giving a parliamentary address to his ruling AKP, president Recep Tayyip Erdogan said that Turkey will continue its military operation in Syria's Afrin and Manbij regions.

On 20 January 2018, the Turkish military began an intervention in the Afrin region of Syria, code-named by Turkey as Operation Olive Branch.

On 28 October 2018, one day after a summit with the heads of state of France, Germany, Russia and Turkey, Turkey started shelling targets in northern Syria. On 12 December 2018, Erdoğan said during a televised speech that Turkey would launch a military operation against the Kurds east of the Euphrates river in northern Syria within days. He added that since the US-backed Kurdish fighters in Syria had not left the town of Manbij and the Americans wouldn't remove them, as agreed in a US-Turkish deal, that Turkey would do it. The United States responded that such actions would be unacceptable and that "coordination and consultation between the U.S. and Turkey is the only approach to address issues of security concern in this area." Erdoğan also said that Turkey's "anti-terror" operations in northern Iraq would continue.

Following the January 2019 Manbij bombing, Erdogan told Trump that Turkey was ready to take over security in the town.

2019 military intervention 

In October, another Turkish offensive into north-eastern Syria began, after US President Trump ordered the withdrawal of US forces. According to Erdoğan, the operation was intended to expel the SDF from the border region as well as to create a 30 km-deep (20 mi) "safe zone" in Northern Syria where some of the 3.6 million Syrian refugees in Turkey would resettle.

This intention was criticized as an attempt at ethnic cleansing, a criticism denied by the Turkish government who claimed they intended to "correct" the demographics that it alleges have been changed by the SDF. Turkey began to appoint mayors in several northern Syrian towns in late 2019.

A journalist team from CNN consisting of correspondent Clarissa Ward, producer Salma Abdelaziz and cinematographer Christopher Jackson filmed exclusively as civilians fled the offensive from the town of Ras al-Ain, Syria. CNN received an Emmy award for Outstanding Breaking News Coverage for their reporting.

The prospects for Kurdish autonomy in the region severely diminished, because the Kurds were exposed to the Turkish-led offensive by the U.S. withdrawal and the Russia-backed Syrian government forces under Assad—whose commonality is enmity towards Turkey and Sunni rebel militias—regained their foothold in northeast Syria after the Kurds had to seek their help. In December 2019, various Kurdish faction that were historical rivals began to meet in order to work together more. Their stated reason was to stand together against Russia and Turkey more strongly if needed. The Russian government has informed the Kurdish factions that they should reconcile and come up with a unified set of demands to clarify to Russia. Various Kurdish factions blamed each other and their council for lack of progress.

2022 cross-border airstrikes 

On 26 November 2022, Mazloum Abdi of the Syrian Democratic Forces stated that they halted operations against the Islamic State group due to Turkish attacks on northern Syria. He also accused Turkish strikes of causing severe damage to the region’s infrastructure. Two rockets also targeted U.S.-led coalition forces at bases in the northeastern Syrian town of Ash Shaddadi.

According to the Syrian Observatory of Human Rights, in 2022, Turkish forces killed 138 Kurdish and SDF-fighters, 26 Syrian troops and 74 civilians, including 16 children. In addition, 16 Turkish troops were killed in Syria.

Turkey–ISIL conflict

2015–2016: ISIL terror attacks in Turkey 

Five people were arrested. The detainees said they attempted crossing the border from the village of Aegean into Tal Abyad city in the Al-Raqqah Province.

On 20 July 2015, a cultural center in Suruç was bombed by a 20-year-old male Turkish
ISIL member. 32 people were killed in the town of Suruç's municipal culture center in the southeastern province of Şanlıurfa, and at least 100 people were hospitalised.

On 10 October 2015 at 10:04 local time (EEST) in Ankara, the capital city of Turkey, two bombs were detonated outside Ankara Central railway station. With a death toll of 103 civilians, the attack surpassed the 2013 Reyhanlı bombings as the deadliest terror attack in modern Turkish history. Another 500 people were injured.

On 19 March 2016, a suicide bombing took place in Istanbul's Beyoğlu district in front of the district governor's office. The attack occurred at 10:55 (EET) at the intersection of Balo Street with İstiklal Avenue, a central shopping street. The attack caused at least five deaths, including that of the perpetrator. 36 people were injured, including seven whose injuries were severe. Among those injured were twelve foreign tourists. Among those killed, two were of dual Israel-US nationality. On 22 March, the Turkish interior minister said that the bomber had links with ISIL.

On 28 June 2016, ISIL militants attacked Istanbul's Atatürk Airport. The three suicide bombers opened fire at passengers before blowing themselves up. The attacks left 45 dead and 230 wounded.

April–May 2016: Cross-border confrontations 
Turkish artillery strikes killed over 54 ISIL militants in April 2016, whilst 5 people were killed and 22 others were wounded by ISIL rocket projectiles hitting the border province of Kilis.

The Turkish Foreign Ministry has demanded raising awareness on the Kilis to the U.S. Department of State. Turkey also demanded the deployment of High Mobility Artillery Rocket System (HIMARS) rocket launchers at Turkey's Syria border. According to Turkey, such moves would push ISIL militants southwards, leaving the border province of Kilis out of battery ranges.

From 3 May 2016 to 6 May rocket fire struck the Turkish city of Kilis from ISIS controlled territory with the Turkish Army responding with fire at every attack.

On 6 May the governor's office in Kilis released an official statement declared the province a "special security area," effective for 15 days until 5:00 p.m. on 20 May.

Also, in the morning hours, the Turkish military carried out four separate air strikes against ISIL positions in northern Syria, as part of a joint effort and intelligence with the U.S.-led coalition forces.
Two Katyusha rockets were fired from ISIL positions in Syria on the southeastern province of Kilis following the air strikes. Turkish armed forces responded to the attack by shelling ISIL targets with howitzers from the border.

In the evening hours, reconnaissance and surveillance vehicles spotted ISIL positions in the Suran region north of Aleppo and the Baragidah and Kuşacık regions northeast of Tal el Hişn. Army shelled them. A total of 55 ISIL militants were killed in the shellings, while three vehicles and three rocket launchers belonging to the jihadist group were also destroyed.

From 11 to 15 May a total of 55 ISIL militants were killed by Turkey and U.S.-led coalition in operations targeting positions belonging to the jihadist group in Syria, Turkish security sources have said.

International collaboration

NATO schism 
In late 2019, there were signs of a schism between Turkey and other NATO members, in which NATO was seen as effectively "powerless" to manage Turkish interventions and the Turkish government is aware that NATO does not hold much leverage. Furthermore, US President Trump, as well as US military and diplomatic officials, has cited the NATO membership of Turkey as a key reason that the United States can not be involved in the conflict between the Turkish and Syrian Kurdish forces. Meanwhile, due to Turkey's strategic position between Europe and the Middle East, the NATO alliance members are in a situation where they have limited themselves to relatively muted criticism.

At the NATO summit in London in December 2019, President Emmanuel Macron of France highlighted major differences with Turkey over the definition of terrorism, and said there was little chance this aspect of the conflict could be resolved positively. Macron criticized Turkey strongly for fighting against groups who had been allied with France and the West in fighting terrorism.

Numerous issues in resolving the conflict emerged at the NATO summit in London. Turkey proposed a safe zone where Syrian refugees could be relocated, but this idea did not receive support from all parties. One professed "exclusive" press report claimed that prior to the NATO Summit, there was a meeting at 10 Downing Street of the leaders of France, the UK, Germany and Turkey. One key point that emerged that the Western countries insisted that refugees could only be relocated voluntarily. Meanwhile, there were concerns in NATO about Turkey's growing closeness with Russia.

Erdogan claimed that a four-way summit on Syria was scheduled to occur in Turkey in February 2020, to include Turkey, Germany, the UK and France.

United States

Incirlik Air Base 
On 13 October 2014, Turkey denied the United States to use Incirlik Air Base for attacking ISIS militants in Syria. The US has been frustrated that its efforts to build an international coalition to tackle ISIS forces from the air have been partly hobbled by the difficulty of getting Turkey engaged. Later, on 23 July 2015, after long negotiations with USA, Turkey has agreed to allow U.S. planes to launch airstrikes against Islamic State militants. The U.S. officials declined to give details of the agreement with Turkey. On 25 February 2016, Saudi Arabian warplanes began arriving at the base as part of an anti-Isis build-up being deployed over Syria. The Saudi deployment added to US, German and British aircraft already using the base.

On 2 and 3 April 2016, the families of U.S. troops and civilian personnel stationed at İncirlik Air Base left the base after an order by the Pentagon and the U.S. State Department to leave several areas of Turkey for their security.

In August 2016, four Danish F-16 fighter jets have entered combat in Syria for the first time, hitting targets in Raqqa. The four jets, which have been stationed at the İncirlik airbase since 17 June 2016, have been flying surveillance and reconnaissance missions over Syria with combat missions limited to Iraq until then.

The New York Times reported that in response to the October 2019 Turkish intervention, the U.S. was reviewing the potential withdrawal of its nuclear weapons from Incirlik airbase under NATO's nuclear sharing. . Republican senator Lindsey Graham and Democratic representative Eric Swalwell called for possibly suspending Turkey's membership in NATO.

United States role in the Syrian civil war 

In May 2016 Turkish Foreign Minister Mevlut Cavusoglu was very angry because of some photos which showed US special forces in Syria wearing insignia of Kurdish militia (patch of the YPJ), during joint operations against Islamic State (IS). He called the U.S. "two-faced" and said the practice was "unacceptable". Pentagon press secretary Peter Cook said it is common for US soldiers to attempt to blend in with local partners.

According to Turkish Foreign Minister Mevlüt Çavuşoğlu, Turkey has proposed to the USA a detailed plan for a joint military operation against jihadists inside Syria with the Americans and other allied troops. But U.S. officials denied it and said that Turkey had not offered a detailed plan but only a few basic concepts which involved joint efforts only to support non-Kurdish forces.

After U.S. forces allowed the October 2019 Turkish incursion into northeastern Syria, the Trump administration was criticized for "abandoning" its Kurdish allies in favor of Turkey. SDF commander-in-chief Mazloum Abdi stated that "We are disappointed and frustrated by the current crisis. Our people are under attack, and their safety is our paramount concern. Two questions remain: How can we best protect our people? And is the United States still our ally?" Several U.S. lawmakers criticized the apparent abandonment, remarking that it undermined U.S. credibility as an ally while only benefiting Russia, Iran, and Assad's government.

Russian Federation 
The Turco-Russian confrontation took place between Turkey and, initially, the Syrian government which turned into a military crisis between Turkey and Russia after the November 2015 shoot-down of a Russian Air Force Su-24 by the Turkish Air Force after a reported airspace violation. Increased Russian military intervention on behalf the Syrian Government and hostile Turkish territorial responses have all contributed to increasing escalation. Aerial confrontations between two nations have grown more common. Turkey said Russian Forces violated Turkish sovereign airspace committed war crimes against Syrian Turkmens. The Russian military has said Turkey had illegal economic ties with ISIS and planning was military intervention in Syria.

On 22 February 2016, U.S. and Russia announced a deal for a truce to take effect in Syria on 27 February, referred to as "cessation of hostilities". On 24 February, Turkish president, Erdoğan, during a speech said that "The PYD and the YPG need to be out of the scope of the cease-fire, just like Daesh (ISIL) is."

On 25 February, Turkish prime minister Ahmet Davutoğlu said that Turkey would not comply with the truce: "This deal is not binding for us when a party is of threat to Turkey, when Turkey's security is at stake".

November 2015 Turkish shootdown of Russian Su-24 

Turkish F-16s shoot down a Russian Su-24 operating in Northern Latakia. Both occupants ejected successfully. The pilot was shot and killed by Syrian Turkmen rebel ground fire while descending by parachute. The weapon systems officer was rescued two days later. A Russian naval infantryman from the search-and-rescue team launched to retrieve the two airmen was also killed when a rescue helicopter was shot down by the rebels.

Turkey and Russia–Syria–Iran–Iraq coalition 
In December 2015, Turkey rejected to join the anti-ISIL quartet of Syria, Iran, Iraq and Russia. Turkish President Recep Tayyip Erdoğan said that he rejected it due to the presence of Syria's president Bashar al-Assad.

During an International Syria Support Group (ISSG) meeting in Vienna on 17 May 2016, Turkish Foreign Minister Mevlüt Çavuşoğlu told his Russian counterpart Sergei Lavrov that if Moscow has any evidence that shows Turkey helping the ISIL then he would resign.

Russian General Staff Lt. Gen. Sergey Rudskoy told journalists that Al-Nusra Front is receiving daily arms shipments across the border from Turkey and that Al-Nusra Front remains a major destabilizing factor in Syria. He also added that Al-Nusra Front often attack the Syrian Government forces despite the cease-fire and that the attacks are confirmed by other nations as well.

On 13 March 2016, Russian Foreign Minister Sergey Lavrov said Russia has evidence of Turkey's "creeping expansion" in northern Syria. He said Turkey was fortifying positions hundreds of metres from the border, inside Syria and was also sending its military across the Syrian border for Operation Against Kurds and to prevent Kurdish groups there from consolidating their positions. Turkey denied the Russian claims.

A new round of meetings for the Astana summit process took place in the Kazakh capital Nur Sultan in December 2019. The meeting includes Russia, Syria, Turkey and Iran. Several experts said the conflict was slowly moving towards resolution. One expert said that the "Astana" diplomatic process, involving Turkey, Russia, and Iran, was having some positive results. Experts also said that Bashar Assad had made progress in restoring rule by local councils in areas affected by the conflict.

Russo-Turkish regularization of diplomatic ties 

On 26 June 2016 Turkish President Recep Tayyip Erdoğan writes Russian President Vladimir Putin to offer condolences to the family of the deceased Russian pilot of the Sukhoi Su-24 warplane shot down last November. The Kremlin has asked for a personal apology for months. A Turkish spokesman says this is a step toward improving bilateral relations between the two countries.

On 1 July 2016, Turkish and Russian foreign ministers said that the two countries will "coordinate" their policies over Syria.

On 14 July 2016, Turkish Prime Minister Binali Yıldırım has said that al-Assad must go before any change in Turkey's stance regarding Syria. He added that between al-Assad or ISIL, Turkey cannot choose either of them and that the main reason things have come to this point is because of al-Assad.

Second Northern Syria Buffer Zone 

Following Operation Peace Spring in October 2019, in which Turkish and Turkish-backed rebel forces invaded northern Syria again, Turkey and Russia increased collaboration in the area. Several commentators in Moscow stated at the time that the situation is not in the immediate Russian interests, as the Turkish intervention in Syria clashes with Russia's backing of the Syrian government in the region, but it may provide opportunities for Russia as mediator as the US withdraws from Syria.

Russia arranged for negotiations between the Syrian government in Damascus and the Kurdish-led forces. Mazloum Abdi, the Syrian Kurdish commander-in-chief, announced that they were ready to partner with Vladimir Putin (Russia) and Bashar al-Assad (Syria), stating that "We know that we would have to make painful compromises with Moscow and Bashar al-Assad if we go down the road of working with them. But if we have to choose between compromises and the genocide of our people, we will surely choose life for our people." The details of the agreement is unknown, but there are reports that suggest that the SDF will be incorporated into the Syrian Armed Forces and that northeastern Syria will come under direct rule of the Syrian government in Damascus. According to Syrian Kurdish officials, the deal allowed Syrian government forces to take over security in some border areas, but their own administration would maintain control of local institutions.

Russia's Ministry of Defense announced on 15 October that Russian forces had begun to patrol the region along the line of contact between Turkish and Syrian forces, indicating that Russia was filling the security vacuum from the sudden U.S. withdrawal. Video footage shows Russian soldiers and journalists touring a base that the US left behind. Alexander Lavrentiev, Russia's special envoy on Syria, warned that the Turkish offensive into Syria was unacceptable and stated that Russia was seeking to prevent conflict between Turkish and Syrian troops.

Russia said it would pledge to remove Turkish forces from a key highway in northern Syria, and replace them with Russian forces to maintain stability. It was reported that the Russian and Turkish armies had made a deal whereby electricity would be supplied to Tal Abyad by Russia's allies, the Kurdish-led Syrian Democratic Forces (SDF) who support Assad; while water would be supplied by the Alouk water station that is controlled by Turkish forces. This deal was mainly facilitated by Russian military officials. In December 2019, it appeared that Turkey was withdrawing all of its forces away from the al-Shirkark silos, which hold important supplies of wheat, this seemed to be a result of Russian mediation.

Mustafa Bali, head of the Syrian Democratic Forces (SDF) said there were some agreements on the ground with the Syrian government, for Syrian forces to be deployed along the border. Russian military officials forged agreements between Syria, Turkey and Kurds for areas to be patrolled by each side.

Russian and Turkish forces have continued their joint patrols. Questions remained about how much control Turkey has over its proxies, such as the Free Syrian Army.

Refugees 

Satellite images confirmed that the first Syrian camps appeared in Turkey in July 2011, shortly after the towns of Deraa, Homs and Hama were besieged. By June 2013, Turkey has accepted 400,000 Syrian refugees, half of whom are spread around a dozen camps placed under the direct authority of the Turkish Government. In 2014, the number swelled over a million, as some 200–300,000 Syrian Kurds streamed into Turkey in September alone, upon the Siege of Kobane.

The population of Syrian refugees in Turkey has 30 percent in 22 government-run camps near the Syrian-Turkish border. The rest do their best to make ends meet in communities across the country.

Turkey has accepted over 3.5 million Syrian refugees since the beginning of the Syrian Civil War. Turkey has accommodated most of its Syrian refugees in tent cities administered by the country's emergency management agency.

Erdogan stated that Turkey was ready to resettle the Syrian refugees in the northern area that Turkey had invaded in October 2019, and that Turkey would pay for it if necessary. On 9 December 2019, various local accounts indicated that Turkey was moving Syrian refugees into its zone of operations in Northern Syria for the first time. Erdogan said that Turkey was working to settle one million people in the cities of Tal Abyad and Ras Al-Ain in northern Syria. This has led to fears of population change

Criticism and concerns

Targeting of Kurds and alleged collusion with Syrian extremists 

Turkey has been stated to be supporting or colluding with ISIL, especially by Syrian Kurds. Syrian Kurds and Turkey's main Kurdish party, HDP, said Turkey was allowing ISIL soldiers to cross its border and attack the Kurdish town of Kobanî in late 2014. They also stated that Islamic State snipers were hiding among grain depots on the Turkish side of the border and firing on the town. In addition, the Syrian Observatory for Human Rights said that the vehicle which is used in a car bombing attack at Kobanî had come from Turkish territory. According to journalist Patrick Cockburn, writing in late 2014, there is "strong evidence for a degree of collaboration" between the Turkish intelligence services and ISIL, although the "exact nature of the relationship ... remains cloudy". David L. Phillips of Columbia University's Institute for the Study of Human Rights, who compiled a list of statements saying Turkey was assisting ISIL, wrote in late 2014 that these allegations "range from military cooperation and weapons transfers to logistical support, financial assistance, and the provision of medical services". Several ISIL fighters and commanders said in this period that Turkey supported ISIL. A former ISIS member mentioned that the ISIS groups were given free rein by Turkey's army. He said: "ISIS commanders told us to fear nothing at all because there was full cooperation with the Turks. ... ISIS saw the Turkish army as its ally especially when it came to attacking the Kurds in Syria." Within Turkey itself, ISIL is reported to have caused increasing political polarisation between secularists and Islamists. A video taken in October 2014 shows Turkish soldiers fraternising with Isis fighters near Kobane. Turkish security forces dispersed Kurds who had gathered at the Turkish border with Syria to cross into Syria and fight with Kurdish militants against ISIS. Sadi Pria, a top Iraqi Kurdish official in Irbil said: "Turkey shamelessly and openly backs IS and al-Qaeda terrorists against Kurdish freedom fighters".

Kurds say Turkey was using the US-led coalition against IS as a cover to attack the Kurdish PKK in both Turkey and Iraq, and now against the YPG in northern Syria. The Kurds say that Turkey 's bombardment of their positions is helping IS to attack Kurdish-held frontline areas in Syria and Iraq. IS militants attacked Syrian Kurdish villages south of Kobane a day after Turkey began shelling the YPG.

Turkey was further criticised in this period for allowing individuals from outside the region to enter its territory and join ISIL in Syria. A report by Sky News showed documents showing that passports of foreign Islamists wanting to join ISIL by crossing into Syria had been stamped by the Turkish government. American website Al-Monitor stated in June 2014 that Turkey, during the Syrian Civil War, by "ignoring its own border security", had allowed its Syrian border to become a "jihadist highway" for ISIL to let thousands of international jihadists, and other supplies, reach Syria. British newspaper The Guardian stated that Turkey late 2014 "for many months did little to stop foreign recruits crossing its border to Isis". An ISIL commander stated that "most of the fighters who joined us in the beginning of the war came via Turkey, and so did our equipment and supplies", adding that ISIL fighters received treatment in Turkish hospitals. After the 2015 attacks at Paris, President Barack Obama administration told the Turkish government to close its borders to ISIS fighters. A USA senior official said in the Wall Street Journal "The game has changed. Enough is enough. The border needs to be sealed," "This is an international threat, and it's coming out of Syria and it's coming through Turkish territory."

In January 2013, a Syrian Parliament member, Fares Shehabi, accused Turkey of stealing production lines and machines from hundreds of factories in Aleppo through its rebel allies there. Same accusation was mentioned by Syrian President, Bashar al-Assad, in 2019 by calling the Turkish President, Recep Tayyip Erdoğan, a "thief".

Francis Ricciardone, United States Ambassador to Turkey from 2011 to 2014, told in an interview at 2014 that Turkey has directly supported al-Qaeda in Syria. Turkish authorities supported and helped extremist Islamist groups like al-Nusra Front and Ahrar al-Sham. He also added that he tried to persuade the Turkish government to close its borders to the extremists, but to no avail. He said Turkey allowed its borders to be used as a conduit for aid, weapons and volunteers and did nothing to distinguish between "moderate" groups and extremists.

In July 2014, the Member of the European Parliament, James Carver made two questions in the European Commission after some press reports about the Turkey support on ISIS. In August, the Commission responded that there are no evidence to support press allegations, adding that the Turkish Ministry of Foreign Affairs has repeatedly dismissed such allegations, noting that ISIS poses a significant security threat to Turkey.

In October 2014, an Egyptian official said that MIT was helping the ISIS with satellite images and other critical data.

In 2014, the Jordanian intelligence said that they arrested ISIS members who tried to enter Jordan from Syria in order to carry attacks against the country and the militants admitted upon interrogation that they have trained in Turkey.

Turkey has openly supported jihadi groups, such as Ahrar ash-Sham, which espouses much of al-Qaida's ideology, and Jabhat al-Nusra, which is proscribed as a terror organisation by much of the US and Europe,.

Israel's defence minister, Moshe Ya'alon, said that Turkey had "permitted jihadists to move from Europe to Syria and Iraq and back".

The Director of National Intelligence, James R. Clapper, said in 2015 that he was not optimistic that Turkey would do more in the fight against the Islamic State. "I think Turkey has other priorities and other interests." He also cited public opinion polls in Turkey that show Turks do not see the Islamic State as a primary threat.

US Vice President, Joe Biden, during a speech at Harvard said Turkey and the Gulf countries were funding, supplying and supporting ISIL. Later, he apologised over his remarks. In late 2015, both Donald Trump on Sirius XM's "Breitbart News Daily", and the Minister of Defense of Armenia, Seyran Ohanyan, said Turkey was supporting ISIS.

In early 2016, the King of Jordan, Abdullah, said that the Turkish president "believes in a radical Islamic solution to the problems in the region" and the "fact that terrorists are going to Europe is part of Turkish policy, and Turkey keeps getting a slap on the hand, but they get off the hook".

In September 2014, Egypt's foreign ministry under President Sisi said the Turkish president was being a supporter of terrorists who seek to "provoke chaos" in the Middle East.

In 2014, Cypriot Foreign Minister Ioannis Kasoulidis, questioned Turkey's determination to fight ISIS. In 2015, Greek Cypriot Intelligence Agency chief said that people in the Turkish Republic of Northern Cyprus could be helping members of the ISIL militant group travel between Europe and Syria. He added that the Greek Cypriot Intelligence Agency had received intelligence of a group of ISIL sympathizers who were traveling to the Greek Cypriot-controlled south of the island and had blocked their entry before sending them back.

In a 2015 interview on Russian state media, Eren Erdem, member of the main opposition at Turkey, CHP, said the Turkish Government was failing to investigate Turkish supply routes used to provide ISIL with toxic Sarin gas ingredients. Because of this statement, he faces treason charges in Turkey. The CHP's Kemal Kılıçdaroğlu warned the Turkish government not to provide money and training to terror groups. He said, "It isn't right for armed groups to be trained on Turkish soil. You bring foreign fighters to Turkey, put money in their pockets, guns in their hands, and you ask them to kill Muslims in Syria. We told them to stop helping ISIS." He also said after the 2015 Ankara bombings that the Turkish Government is "protecting" the ISIL and that "the police department knows all", "the only reason for not having security measures taken or for not having them [suspects] detained is the absence of an instruction from the political authority to fulfill whatever was required. That's to say, its [the political authority's] protection of ISIL."

A Russian anti-drug chief said that ISIS is using Turkey for trafficking heroin to Europe. He, also, said that ISIS makes about $1 billion from Afghan heroin trade.

Syria's president Bashar al-Assad during an interview at 2015 mentioned that military and logistic support from Turkey was the key factor in ISIL takeover of Idlib (2015 Idlib offensive), he also blamed Turkey for the failure of a humanitarian ceasefire plan in Aleppo. He said that: "The Turks told the factions – the terrorists that they support and they supervise – to refuse to cooperate with de Mistura".

Iran said Turkey is the main culprits in supporting the terrorist movements of ISIL.

In July 2016, a leaked confidential report produced by the German Interior Ministry said Turkey was supporting terrorist groups across the Middle East including various Islamist groups fighting in Syria. The report showed that Germany sees Turkey as platform for Islamist groups in the Middle East.

Hezbollah Chief, Hassan Nasrallah, said Turkey and Qatar were supporting ISIS.

A US-led raid, at which the ISIS official responsible for oil smuggling Abu Sayyaf was killed, produced evidence that Turkish officials directly dealt with ranking ISIS members. Senior Western official familiar with the captured intelligence told the Observer that "There are hundreds of flash drives and documents that were seized there,". "They are being analysed at the moment, but the links are already so clear that they could end up having profound policy implications for the relationship between us and Ankara."

At January 2016, The Guardian obtained documents which show that ISIL ran a sophisticated immigration operation through the Syrian border town of Tell Abyad with Turkey until its defeat by Kurds. The border crossing remained open until Kurdish forces took control of the town (Tell Abyad offensive), at which point Turkey promptly sealed it. David Phillips, an academic at Columbia University and author of two recent research papers into links between Turkey and ISIS, says that the country "knows the movements of all persons and can control the flow across the border if it chooses". He said there was "a steady stream of vehicles, individuals, weapons, financing, oil going back and forth", adding: "It's not like people are putting on their hiking boots and crossing over rough terrain. There's an extensive surface transport network which is highly regulated and controlled ... on both sides of the border." Academic researcher Aymenn al-Tamimi, an expert on examining Isis documents, said he had no doubt about the authenticity of the manifests. "The documents ... coincide with other documents illustrating daily bus routes within Islamic State territory. Though private companies provide the actual transportation, the Islamic State bureaucracy is responsible for authorising and overseeing the routes," he said. A senior Turkish government official, in response to the Guardian's statements, said that Turkey was doing everything it could to stop the influx of foreign fighters, including cracking down on recruitment and logistic networks such as travel agents mentioned in the documents.

Anonymous launched Cyber-attacks on Turkey after saying it was supporting ISIS by buying oil from them and treating their wounded in hospital. They have also told that they will continue the attacks as long as Turkey is supporting ISIS.

Columbia University assigned a team of researchers in the United States, Europe, and Turkey to examine Turkish and international media assessing the credibility of allegations and published a research paper entitled "ISIS-Turkey Links". The report draws on a variety of international sources and present many allegations that appeared in the media.

In an email to The Guardian, Noam Chomsky said Recep Tayyip Erdoğan is hypocrite. He said: "Turkey blamed Isis (for the attack on Istanbul at 2016), which Erdoğan has been aiding in many ways, while also supporting the al-Nusra Front, which is hardly different."

Jacques Behnan Hindo, the Syrian Catholic Archbishop of Hasakeh-Nisibi, said Turkey was preventing Christians from fleeing Syria while allowing jihadists to cross its border unchecked. He said on the Vatican Radio, "In the north, Turkey allows through lorries, Daesh (ISIS) fighters, oil stolen from Syria, wheat and cotton: all of these can cross the border but nobody (from the Christian community) can pass over.". He said it a day after ISIL abducted more than 90 Assyrian Christians from villages.

Members of the Democratic Union Party (Kurds) said the Turkish military of opened fire at its forces in Tal Abyad after the majority Arab town was included into a Kurdish enclave after fights with ISIS soldiers. The Turkish Prime Minister Ahmet Davutoglu confirmed it and he said that Turkey had warned the PYD not to cross to the "west of the Euphrates and that we would hit it the moment it did. We hit it twice".

Turkey, at January 2016, didn't allow Kurdish groups from northern Syria to take part in peace talks in Geneva. Turkish PM said that the participation of YPG represents a 'direct threat' to his country.

In February 2016, US urged Turkey to stop the shelling of the Kurds and focus on fighting the ISIL.

In February 2016, Syria and the Syrian Observatory for Human Rights stated Turkey was allowing Islamist fighters to travel through Turkish territory to reinforce Islamist rebels in Azaz and Tal Rifaat.

In February 2016, Hezbollah said Turkey and Saudi Arabia were using the Islamic State group as a "pretext" to launch a ground operation in Syria, after Turkey's suggestion to the U.S. and other allies in an international coalition against the Islamic State group for ground operations in Syria.

On 10 February 2016, Russian Ambassador Vitaly Churkin sent a letter to the UN Security Council. He said in the letter that recruiters from ISIL had reportedly established a network in the Turkish city of Antalya for foreign fighters from the former Soviet Union. He also said in the letter that, in September, a group of 1,000 IS fighters from Europe and Central Asia were taken from Turkey to Syria through the border crossing at Gaziantep. In addition, he said that in early 2015, Turkish intelligence services reportedly helped move ethnic Tatars who were fighting for the Al-Qaeda aligned Nusra Front from Antalya to Eskişehir and, also, that it was helping to fly ISIL militants from Syria through Turkey to Yemen using Turkish military air transport, or by sea to Yemen's port of Aden.

On 17 February 2016, at least 500 armed fighters crossed the Turkish border heading for the Syrian town of Azaz to fight against the Kurdish forces according to the head of the Syrian Observatory for Human Rights.

After the February 2016 Ankara bombing the head of the Syrian Kurdish Democratic Union Party (PYD) denied any involvement and said that Turkey is using this attack as a "pretext" to intervene in Syria.

The Syrian branch of the Turkistan Islamic Party uses the Turkish Postal Service and Turkish banks to solicit donations via the organization "Türkistan İslam Derneği" through the website "Doğu Türkistan Bulenti".

In 2018, Bassam Ishak, member of the Syrian Democratic Council, said that the Turkish military support Syrian and foreign jihadis to conquer Syrian land.

In 2018, an ex-Isis source, said Turkey was recruiting and retraining Isis fighters in order to participate in the Turkish military operation in Afrin against the Kurds. In addition, in a statement carried by Al Jazeera Arabic, The Pentagon said that Turkish military operations in Afrin are impeding the task to eliminate ISIS.

In 2018, an article in a Turkish newspaper mentioned that the Hayat Tahrir al-Sham escorted a Turkish military convoy in Syria.

In May 2018, Syria's President Bashar al-Assad deprecated Erdoğan's affiliation with the Muslim Brotherhood, which is considered as a terrorist organisation in Syria.

In October 2019, Republican Senator Lindsey Graham stated he would "introduce bipartisan sanctions against Turkey if they invade Syria". Graham said he would also "call for their suspension from NATO if they attack Kurdish forces who assisted the US in the destruction of the ISIS Caliphate".

On 9 October 2019, Brett McGurk, the former US envoy for the global coalition to counter the ISIS tweeted that Turkey "foreclosed any serious cooperation on ISIS even as 40k foreign fighters flowed through its territory into Syria."

According to documents revealed in 2019, the Turkish National Intelligence Organization (MIT) was secretly transported ammunition and fighters into Syria with buses in 2015.

In 2019, the United States Department of the Treasury imposed sanctions on Turkish individuals and companies for providing financial support to the ISIS. The sanctions raised questions about the Turkish commitment to fight the ISIS networks inside Turkey. Also, in 2021 imposed sanctions on Alaa Khanfurah and his Turkey-based money service business, because in 2017-2020 provided support, including financial and material support, to ISIS  throughout Syria.

According to the 2021 Report on Human Rights, the Turkish supported group Ahrar al-Sharqiya killed Hevrin Khalaf and integrated former ISIS members into its ranks.

Arms trafficking 

Turkey's state intelligence agency, MIT were said by Turkish judicial sources talking to Reuters that it was helping to deliver arms to parts of Syria under Islamist rebel control during late 2013 and early 2014. Turkish journalists who reporting this were charged with spying and "divulging state secrets" from the Turkish court. One of the journalists said:"Those who sent the convoy from Turkey knew that the weapons were "heading to end [up] in ISIS hands". Also, Turkish officers, who intercepted some of the intelligence agency's weapons-filled trucks, have faced spying charges. Furthermore, the Turkish government have given orders to the officers to let the trucks pass into the Syria. In June 2019, a Turkish court convicted the group officers and prosecutors, who stopped the MIT trucks, of at least two decades behind bars for obtaining and disclosing confidential state documents. They were also said to be FETÖ members. 
In addition, Turkish newspaper, Cumhuriyet, published video footage which it said showed security forces discovering weapons parts being sent to Syria on trucks belonging to the MIT state intelligence agency.
In December 2020, Turkish court sentenced to prison 27 people because they stopped the MIT trucks in 2014.

In 2015, Reuters revealed that according to a prosecutor and court testimony during 2013-2014 the MIT delivered arms to Islamists.

In February 2016, Kılıçdaroğlu repeated statement that the Turkish government has sent arms to jihadist groups in Syria and built jihadist training camp in Turkey.

On 18 March 2016, Russia's UN Ambassador Vitaly Churkin sent a letter to the UN Security Council saying that three Turkish humanitarian organizations (NGOs) sent weapons and supplies to extremists in Syria on behalf of Turkey's MIT intelligence agency. The three NGOs were the Besar Foundation, the Iyilikder Foundation and the Foundation for Human Rights and Freedoms (IHH). In addition, in an interview at 2018, the former Turkish National Police official, Ahmet Yayla, said that the MIT has used Turkey's IHH as an intermediary to arm Islamist terrorists.

Katrin Kunert, a German Parliamentarian from the Green Party leaked a classified document which showed that Turkey was delivering arms to Syrian rebel groups.

In February 2022, the Turkish intelligence captured and abducted from Ukraine the Turkish arm dealer and former special forces captain in the Turkish armed forces, Nuri Bozkir, after he exposed the Turkish arms transfers to militant groups in Syria and Libya. In an interview before his arrest he said that he bought weapons in eastern European countries and shipped them to Turkey. Then the Turkish intelligence sent them to battlefields across the region.

Oil smuggling 

In late 2015, Russian Prime Minister Dmitry Medvedev said "Turkey's actions are de facto protection of Islamic State," Medvedev said, calling the group formerly known as ISIS by its new name. "This is no surprise, considering the information we have about direct financial interest of some Turkish officials relating to the supply of oil products refined by plants controlled by ISIS." Around the same time, Russia Today reported that Russia said that for a long time it had been aware of oil going from Syria under the control of "terrorists" to Turkey, alleging that the money finances "terrorist groups". Vladimir Putin said that "IS has big money, hundreds of millions or even billions of dollars, from selling oil. In addition they are protected by the military of an entire nation. One can understand why they are acting so boldly and blatantly. Why they kill people in such atrocious ways. Why they commit terrorist acts across the world, including in the heart of Europe,". Western intelligence officials said that they can track the ISIS oil shipments as they move across Iraq and into Turkey's southern border regions. The Obama administration was struggling to cut off the millions of dollars in oil revenue made by ISIS, but they were unable to persuade Turkey. In addition, the former Iraqi member of Parliament Mowaffak al-Rubaie has said Turkey was turning a blind eye to the black market ISIS oil trade. He said that there is "no shadow of a doubt" that the Turkish government knows about the oil smuggling operations. "The merchants, the businessmen [are buying oil] in the black market in Turkey under the noses – under the auspices if you like – of the Turkish intelligence agency and the Turkish security apparatus." In June 2014, a member of Turkey's parliamentary opposition, Ali Edibogluan, said that IS had smuggled $800 million worth of oil into Turkey from Syria and Iraq. Sadik Al Hiseni, the head of the security committee in the city of Diyala in Iraq, says they have arrested several Turkish tankers trying to take ISIS oil out of the province of Salahuddin.

In late 2015, Iraqi Prime Minister Haider al-Abadi said that most of the oil produced in Islamic State-held territory in Iraq and Syria was being smuggled through Turkey. He also mentioned that he sees no evidence that Turkey wants to fight ISIS. In addition he said that Turkey wants to revive the Ottoman Empire.

In late 2015, Iran's Secretary of the Expediency Discernment Council said that Iran has photographs of truck tankers bringing oil to Turkey from ISIS.

Israel's defence minister, Moshe Ya'alon, has said Turkey was buying oil from the ISIS and funds ISIS militants.

In December 2016, WikiLeaks published many emails from the personal email of Berat Albayrak, who was President Recep Tayyip Erdoğan's son-in-law and Turkey's Minister of Energy and Natural Resources. Some of the emails show the involvement of the Albayrak in companies and organisations such as Powertrans, which has been accused of buying oil from ISIS.

According to The Jerusalem Post, Turkey was selling the oil and sharing some of the earnings with ISIS. In addition, claimed that the oil exports stopped in December 2015 after the Russia bombed the tankers which transferred the oil to Turkey.

Criticism of maltreatment of refugees and of other humanitarian misconduct 

According to Amnesty International, Turkish guards routinely shoot at Syrian refugees stranded at the border. Turkey has forcibly returned thousands of Syrian refugees to war zone since mid-January 2016.

On 10 May 2016, Human Rights Watch said Turkish border guards were shooting and beating Syrian refugees trying to reach Turkey, resulting in deaths and serious injuries. Turkish President Recep Tayyip Erdoğan denied it and a Turkish official said that the authenticity of the video is not verified.

On 18 May 2016, lawmakers from the European Parliament Subcommittee on Human Rights (DROI) have said that Turkey should not use Syrian refugees as a bribe for the process of visa liberalization for Turkish citizens inside the European Union.

Syrian Observatory for Human Rights and National Coalition of Syrian Revolution and Opposition Forces stated that 8 or 11 Syrians refugees were killed by Turkish security forces on the night of 18 June 2016, as they attempted to cross the border into Turkey. The Turkish Foreign Ministry denied the statements.

In February 2018, Human Rights Watch reported incidents in which Turkish border guards shot on Syrian asylum seekers who tried to flee Syria. The reports mentioned that some refugees killed and injured. Turkish official denied the accusations.

Turkey reported that between 1957 and 1998, Turkish forces laid 615,419 antipersonnel mines along the Syrian border "to prevent illegal border crossings," These mines are killing Syrians stuck on the border or trying to cross near Kobani. Turkey is required under the Mine Ban Treaty, to destroy all antipersonnel mines, but has missed deadlines. Human Rights Watch states in its report that as of 18 November over 2,000 civilians were still in the Tel Shair corridor section of the mine belt due to the fact that Turkey had been refusing entry for cars or livestock, and the refugees did not want to leave behind their belongings.

Following the European criticism of the 2019 Turkish offensive into north-eastern Syria, the Turkish President Recep Tayyip Erdoğan threatened to open the borders for migrants to Europe, and to expel foreign jihadists in its custody.

In June 2020, the Syria's permanent representative to the UN accused the US and Turkey of having deliberately set fire to agrarian crops at the Jazira Region in Syria.

Allegations of war crimes 

In October 2019, a report of the Amnesty International accused Turkey and its allies for war crimes. Kumi Naidoo said that the Turkish military and their allies do not care about civilian lives.
Furthermore, USA special envoy for Syria said that they had seen evidence of war crimes during Turkey's offensive against the Kurds in Syria, and had demanded an explanation from Turkey. U.S. officials were investigating a report that the restricted burning white phosphorus had been used during the Turkish offensive. Turkish officials have denied that war crimes were committed. The United States Secretary of Defense, Mark Esper, said in an interview that Turkey “appears to be” committing war crimes in Syria, adding that there was footage showing the execution of Kurdish captives.

Moreover, the International Bar Association condemned the assaults against Syrian Kurds by Turkish forces in northern Syria, and called on Turkey to halt the attacks and respect the civilians as it is obligated by international laws, after the reports of Turkish-backed militias executing civilians.

Furthermore, the same month during the hearing of the US Committee on Foreign Relations when Senator Cardin asked the ambassador Jeffrey if he is aware of reports of the United Nations and other groups about war crimes which have been committed by the Turkish forces in their invasion into Syria, the ambassador said:  When then was asked if he is aware about the Turkish war crimes which have been mentioned by the United States Secretary of Defense Mark Esper he responded: 

In November 2019, Turkish-backed forces under the command of the Turkish army, have been accused of committing war crimes after mobile phones footage has been revealed. The UN has warned that Turkey could be held responsible for the actions of its allies, while Turkey has promised to investigate. US officials have said that some of the actions in these videos probably constitute war crimes. In addition, U.S. drones appeared to show Turkish-backed forces targeting civilians during their assault on Kurdish areas in Syria, these actions reported as possible war crimes. Democratic Maryland Senator Chris Van Hollen accused the Erdogan of "using Jihadi proxies that include a lot of al Qaeda elements and they are committing human rights abuses, including that the Trump Administration has acknowledged are war crimes." The US State Department spokeswoman Morgan Ortagus told CNN "we had serious concerns regarding reports that the Turkish-Supported Opposition may have engaged in violations of the law of armed conflict in northeast Syria, including reports of the killing of unarmed civilians and prisoners and reports of ethnic cleansing," adding that "those concerns remain."

In March 2020, a UN report accused rebels allied to Turkey for abuses on Kurdish-held areas during an assault, and said if the rebels were acting under the control of Turkish forces, the Turkish commanders may be liable for war crimes. In addition, it called on Turkey to investigate whether it was responsible for an air raid on a civilian convoy near Ras al-Ayn. Turkey denied a role in the attack, while the Syrian Observatory for Human Rights, said that it was conducted by Turkish aircraft.

In September 2020, United Nations asked Turkey to investigate possible war crimes and other human rights violations carried out by Turkish-affiliated groups in the area that Turkey controls in Syria. Turkey accused the UN Human Rights Office of baseless claims and “undue criticism”. The Office of the United Nations High Commissioner for Human Rights said that in the areas controlled by Turkey the number of crimes against civilians have been increased.

The 2021 Country Reports on Human Rights Practices mentioned that Turkish-affiliated groups committed human rights abuses in Syria, including killings, 
torture, sexual violence, transfer of detained civilians across the border into Turkey, enforce demographic change targeting Kurdish Syrians, recruitment of child soldiers and many more.

The Syrian National Army justice system and detention network is under the command of the Turkish forces. In addition, the UN Commission of Inquiry for Syria reported on the presence of Turkish officials in interrogation sessions where torture was used.

The Turkish supported Sultan Murad Division has been accused of war crimes.

The UN Commission of Inquiry for Syria, Office of the United Nations High Commissioner for Human Rights and human rights organisations reported that groups supported by Turkey have tortured and killed civilians.

By August 2022, Airwars estimated that 736-1,189 civilians were killed by Turkish airstrikes in Syria and Iraq since 2015, including 146-170 children, 104-119 women, and 1,400 named victims. The Turkish military has denied that any of its strikes have resulted in civilian casualties. Turkish bombing also injured 1,707-2,331 civilians.

Targeting of journalists and politicians 

Serena Shim, a journalist of Press TV was killed at a car crash with a heavy vehicle in Turkey in what are said, by her employer and her parents, to be suspicious circumstances. The car crash happened just days after she said that the Turkey's state intelligence agency, MIT, had threatened her and said she was spying, due to some of the stories she had covered about Turkey's stance on ISIL militants in Kobane. She also said that she had received images of ISIL militants crossing the Turkish border into Syria in World Food Organization and other NGOs trucks.

Turkish journalist Arzu Yildiz was sentenced to 20 months in jail and lost her parental rights after showing a video related to a weapons-smuggling scandal denied by the Turkish government, in what her lawyer said was "an act of revenge" by Recep Tayyip Erdogan.

On 12 October 2019, Turkish backed forces (Ahrar al-Sharqiya) murdered the Kurdish-Syrian politician Hevrin Khalaf.

Antiquities smuggling 

In 2015, Syria's antiquities chief has said Turkey was refusing to return looted objects from ancient heritage sites in Syria or to provide information about them. Also, Turkey have been said that it lets ISIL smuggles Syrian antiquities through it. In an official letter to UN, the Russian envoy Vitaly Churkin stated that antiquities from Syria and Iraq are exported to Turkey. The main center for the smuggling of cultural heritage items is the Turkish city of Gaziantep, where the stolen goods are sold at illegal auctions. According to the envoy, new smuggling hubs are popping up on the Turkish-Syrian border, with the "bulky goods" being delivered by the Turkish transport companies. Smuggled artifacts then arrive in the Turkish cities of Izmir, Mersin and Antalya, where representatives of international criminal groups produce fake documents on the origin of the antiquities. Turkey responded that she will investigate the claims but believes that the accusations are politically motivated.

Later on, reports emerged in 2019 that following the Operation Olive Branch, more than 16,000 artifacts such as glass, pottery and mosaics mostly from Afrin District, were looted and smuggled to Turkey by Syrian rebels.

In 2022, the Russian Defence Ministry claimed that Turkish-backed forces illegally do excavations in northern Syria. They are using explosives and heavy equipments which destroy the ancient sites. Many also accused Turkey of turning a blind eye in these activities. Turkey in response, according to the Turkish defence, interior and culture and tourism ministries, deployed Turkish soldiers in some of the ancient sites in Syria and started operation to retrieve Syrian smuggled items in Turkey.

Water supplies 

In March 2020, nongovernmental organizations, the World Health Organization and the Kurdish-led administration in northeast Syria said that the water supply from the Alouk pumping station has been repeatedly interrupted after Turkey and its allies took control of the Allouk water station after the Turkish offensive in October 2019. In addition, local authorities and humanitarian groups in Northeast Syria said that they are unable to bring additional supplies into the region because the border with the Kurdistan Region of Iraq is closed. They all warned that doing these in the midst of the COVID-19 pandemic is very dangerous.

In August 2020, the Bashar al-Assad government and the Kurds accused Turkey and its allies that they cut off water to the Al-Hasaka province. The deputy United Nations Humanitarian Coordinator for Syria said to the Security Council that there were frequent water cuts in the Al-Hasakah and the Al-Hawl. The Permanent Representative of Turkey to the United Nations, Feridun Sinirlioğlu, denied the accusations and responded that the water station is powered from a dam, which is controlled by the Syrian Democratic Forces.

Child soldiers 

The Turkish government linked think tank SETA withdrew a report detailing the composition of the Syrian National Army as it revealed the use of child soldiers. In addition, according to a report by Al-Monitor, citing sources on the ground, Turkey has deployed to Libya child soldiers from Syria.

In July 2021, the United States of America added Turkey to the list of countries that implicated in the use of child soldiers, because it used them in Syria and Libya.

The 2021 Country Reports on Human Rights Practices mentioned the recruitment of child soldiers from Turkish-supported forces.

Notes

References 

Battles involving the Islamic State of Iraq and the Levant
Military operations involving Turkey
 
2010s in Turkey